Act Like a Lady, Think Like a Man: What Men Really Think About Love, Relationships, Intimacy, and Commitment is a 2009 self help book by Steve Harvey which describes for women Harvey's concept of how men really think of love, relationships, intimacy, commitment, and how to successfully navigate a relationship with a man.

Synopsis
In the book, Harvey instructs women on how to be a "keeper" rather than a "sports fish". He asserts that men are "simple", and that women should understand that they can never be first in a man's life without understanding and accepting that men are driven by who they are, what they do, and how much they make.

He says it's "just plain dumb" to let a man lock you into a monogamous premarital relationship, where you share a bed, bills, and even kids. The only way to convert your "committed relationship" into a marriage is to insist on setting a date for the wedding.

He writes:

Movie tie-in
A feature film based on the book, titled Think Like a Man, was released by Sony Pictures' Screen Gems subsidiary on April 20, 2012. Harvey served as an executive producer on the film and made a cameo appearance as himself.

See also
 Iliza Shlesinger's "Man Up and Act Like a Lady"

References

External links
 

Self-help books
2009 non-fiction books
Non-fiction books adapted into films
Amistad Press books